Dominique Tchimbakala (born 1977) is a Congolese journalist and television presenter, who is a news anchor for TV5Monde.

Biography 
Tchimbakala was born in France in 1977 to parents who were originally from the Republic of Congo. In 1987 the family returned to the Republic of Congo and she attended Saint-Exupéry High School in Brazzaville. She returned to France to study for a BA in History and an MA in Political Science at University of Paris X-Nanterre. In 2021 she graduated from HEC Paris with an Executive MBA.

Tchimbakala presented for local television in Nantes before moving to work at the Centre for Training and Development of Journalists in Paris (CFPJ). Since 2000 she has worked for a number of French media organisations, including: France 2, France 5, BFMTV, Jeune Afrique. In 2017 she became a news anchor for Jeune Afrique on TV5Monde, which is the most popular French-language news programme in Africa. She has been outspoken about the lack of black workers in news production in France.

In 2018 she was appointed as the President of the Global Association of French High School Alumni (Union-ALFM).

References

External links 

 TV5Monde: Dominique Tchimbakala

Living people
1977 births
Republic of the Congo journalists
Republic of the Congo women journalists
Television presenters
Paris Nanterre University alumni
HEC Paris alumni